Nazif Memedi (born  6 January 1956) is a Croatian politician of Romani ethnicity. He was born in Pršovci (Tetovo Municipality) North Macedonia.

He had graduated from a secondary school for agricultural machine mechanics. In the Croatian parliamentary elections of 2007 he was elected to the Croatian Sabor. He is the first person of Roma ethnicity to become a member of the parliament.

External links 
 
 Profile at the Croatian Sabor website

Representatives in the modern Croatian Parliament
Living people
1956 births
Croatian Romani people
Macedonian emigrants to Croatia
Croatian people of Macedonian descent